Jack Thomas may refer to:
 Jack Thomas (academic), president of Western Illinois University
 Jack Thomas (bishop) (1908–1995), Welsh Anglican bishop
 Jack Thomas (footballer, born 1996), English footballer
 Jack Thomas (footballer, born 1890) (1890–1947), English footballer
 Jack Thomas (swimmer) (born 1995), British swimmer
 Jack W. Thomas (born 1930), American screenwriter and novelist
 Jack Ward Thomas (1934–2016), chief of the U.S. Forest Service
 Joseph T. Thomas (born 1973), known as Jack, Australian citizen whose conviction for receiving funds from Al-Qaeda was overturned on appeal
 John Thomas (lacrosse) (born 1952), known as Jack, American lacrosse player
 A. Jack Thomas, Baltimore-area conductor
 Jack Thomas (speedway rider) (born 1999), British speedway rider

See also
 Jackie Thomas (disambiguation)
 John Thomas (disambiguation)